Watson Park Historic District, also known as Watson Road Historic District and Watson McCord Neighborhood,  is a national historic district located at Indianapolis, Indiana.  The district encompasses 402 contributing buildings and 4 contributing sites in a predominantly residential section of Indianapolis. They include 255 houses, 27 multiple family dwellings, and 120 garages. It was developed between about 1910 and 1960, and includes representative examples of Colonial Revival, Tudor Revival, and Bungalow / American Craftsman style architecture. Located in the district is the Watson Park Bird Sanctuary.

It was listed on the National Register of Historic Places in 2012.

References

Historic districts on the National Register of Historic Places in Indiana
Bungalow architecture in Indiana
Colonial Revival architecture in Indiana
Tudor Revival architecture in Indiana
Historic districts in Indianapolis
National Register of Historic Places in Indianapolis